My Country is a double album by George Jones. It was released on the Musicor label in 1968.

Background
One criticism of Jones's time at Musicor, which lasted from 1965 to 1971, was the lack of quality control. Jones recorded an enormous amount of material during this time and almost all of it got issued on LPs. The label had released a double album called The George Jones Story in 1968, which featured a mix of old and new songs, and My Country repeats the process.  These packages, combined with LPs still being released by his earlier labels Mercury and United Artists, resulted in the market being flooded with releases by "the Possum." In the 1989 documentary Same Ole Me, Starday president Don Pierce recalls producer Pappy Daily's stewardship of Jones's career: "Well, we took him to Mercury, and he became the artist for their country division, and then he took him to United Artists, and he was the country music division at United Artists. Then we took him to Musicor and he was the country division at Musicor, and so a lot of people have been ridin' on ol' George." The cavalier approach taken by Musicor to his recordings would make Jones increasingly unhappy as time went on.

Track listing
"How Proud I Would Have Been"
"Green Grass Grows All Around" (Traditional)
"I'm Wasting Good Paper" (Earl Montgomery)
"Tell Me Something I Don't Know"
"Let a Little Lovin' Come In" (Leon Payne)
"Beneath Still Waters" (Dallas Frazier, Charles Rains)
"My Favorite Lies" (George Jones, Jack Ripley)
"New Man In Town"
"How Wonderful A Poor Man's Life Can Be"
"I Stopped Living Yesterday"
"As Long as I Live" (Roy Acuff)
"Let It Rain, Let It Shine"
"Developing My Pictures" (Earl Montgomery)
"I Can't Go Home"
"Blue Side of Lonesome" (Leon Payne)
"Even the Loser Likes To Dream" 
"Small Time Laboring Man"
"Mansion on the Hill" (Hank Williams, Fred Rose)
"Till I Hear It From You" (George Jones, Jack Ripley)
"The Stranger's Me

1968 albums
George Jones albums
Albums produced by Pappy Daily
Musicor Records albums